Warren Lincoln Rogers (November 14, 1877 – November 6, 1938) was bishop of the Episcopal Diocese of Ohio from 1930 to 1938; he had served previously as coadjutor from 1925 to 1930. The Wa-Li-Ro Episcopal Choir Camp was named for him.

Early life and education
Rogers was born on November 14, 1877, in Allentown, New Jersey, the son of Samuel Hartshorne Rogers and Josephine Lincoln. He was a descendant of President Abraham Lincoln. He received his early education at the Central High School in Detroit. He joined the Episcopal Church while studying at the University of Michigan, from which he graduated with a Bachelor of Arts in 1907. He also attended the Union Theological Seminary (1911) and then the General Theological Seminary (1912) from where he earned a Bachelor of Divinity. He was awarded a Doctor of Divinity from Kenyon College in 1925, and another from the University of the South. On June 29, 1911, Rogers married Helen Clingen Speakman in St Paul's Cathedral. He also received a Doctor of Sacred Theology from Columbia University.

Ordained Ministry
Rogers was ordained deacon in June 1911, and priest on December 20, 1911, both by Bishop Charles D. Williams of Michigan, in St Paul's Cathedral. He was assigned to serve as rector of St Thomas Church in Detroit in 1911, while in 1913, he became the associate rector of Calvary Church in Pittsburgh, Pennsylvania. Between 1916 and 1920, he served as rector of St John's Church in Jersey City, New Jersey, before becoming the Dean of St Paul's Cathedral, Detroit, in 1920, where he remained until 1925. While at St Paul's he was the first to install the use of microphones in the church and was the first clergyman in the country to broadcast a sermon live on radio, which prompted him to be called the Radio Dean.

Bishop
On January 27, 1925, during a special convention of the Diocese of Ohio, Rogers was elected Coadjutor Bishop of Ohio. He was then consecrated on April 30, 1925, in St Paul's Cathedral, Detroit, by the Bishop of Ohio William Andrew Leonard. He succeeded as diocesan on September 21, 1930. He was bishop during the time of the Great Depression, which caused him to cut his salary in half, subjected all other diocesan salaries to 3-month reviews and adjustment, and gave up the bishop's residence, which was then used as a children's shelter. Rogers resigned in October 1938 due to ill health, and died, after suffering a stroke, a month later on November 6, in a hospital in Mount Vernon, Ohio.

References 
 
Encyclopedia of Cleveland History entry

1877 births
1938 deaths
People from Allentown, New Jersey
General Theological Seminary alumni
Union Theological Seminary (New York City) alumni
University of Michigan alumni
Episcopal bishops of Ohio
Burials at Woodlawn Cemetery (Detroit)